Perry Oliver Hooper Sr. (April 8, 1925 – April 24, 2016) was an American jurist who served as the twenty-seventh Chief Justice of the Alabama Supreme Court from 1995 to 2001. He was the first Republican since Reconstruction to have been elected to his state's highest court.
His case was ultimately settled by the US Supreme Court.

Background
With receipt of his Juris Doctor degree, he entered private practice. 

Hooper was active in the Republican Party during the days when it barely existed in Alabama. In 1964, during the Barry Goldwater sweep of Alabama, Hooper was elected probate judge of Montgomery County, the first Republican to have been elected to that position since the 19th century. He continued as the probate judge, handling wills, successions, and estate transactions, until 1974, when was elected Judge of Alabama's 15th Judicial Circuit. In 1983, he returned to private practice.

1968 Senate election
In 1968, Hooper was the Republican nominee for the United States Senate for the open seat vacated by retiring Democrat Lister Hill. In the general election, Hooper received 201,277 votes (24 percent) to 638,774 (76 percent) for the Democratic nominee, former Lieutenant Governor James B. Allen, a conservative whose views were similar to those of Hooper. Still Hooper polled 54,304 more votes in his statewide race than did his party's presidential nominee, Richard M. Nixon. Hooper narrowly held his home county of Montgomery and fared best among upper-income whites, having received two thirds of the vote in higher socio-economic precincts in both Montgomery and Birmingham. Lower-income whites, conversely, supported Allen by a wide margin.

Supreme Court election
In 1994, Hooper was narrowly elected Chief Justice of the Alabama Supreme Court, with a winning margin of just 262 votes. He was not sworn in until October 20, 1995, almost nine months after his term had begun.

It was widely believed that the political allies and trial lawyer friends of Ernest C. "Sonny" Hornsby, the sitting Democrat Chief Justice whom Hooper defeated, were the forces responsible for finding a plaintiff to sue in court to keep the seat for Hornsby. Hornsby refused to leave office until the disposition of the court case. The Verified Complaint sought relief pursuant to 42 U.S.C. § 1983 to protect the right to vote and to preserve election records, as directed in 42 U.S.C. § 1974. The named plaintiff is Larry Roe, seeking to secure protection for his right to vote, and the rights of other qualified voters. Hooper and Martin also joined the complaint. The defendants were a class of election officials in each county responsible for election management: the probate judge, sheriff, and circuit clerk. They are known as the appointing board for each county in the State. See Ala. Code § 17-6-1 (1975). The named defendants at that time were the Wilcox County Appointing Board, the Mobile County Appointing Board, and the probate judge in those two counties. Ri-l-2. Jurisdiction was conferred on the District Court pursuant to 28 U.S.C. § 1331 and § 1343, and relief was sought under 42 U.S.C. § 1983 and the All Writs Act.

Once he took his oath of office, Hooper remained Chief Justice until his retirement in 2001, when fellow Republican Roy Moore, the "Ten Commandments judge," followed him in the position. After an absence from the court for nine years, Moore was again elected chief justice in the general election held on November 6, 2012.

Personal life
Perry Hooper Sr. lived in Montgomery with his wife. They have four children. Hooper's son, Perry O. Hooper Jr., also of Montgomery, is a Republican former member of the Alabama House of Representatives. The junior Hooper was the unsuccessful Republican nominee for the Alabama Public Service Commission in the general election held on November 7, 2006. George Wallace Jr., formerly a Democrat, vacated the PSC position and ran unsuccessfully in the Republican primary for lieutenant governor.

Hooper died at home on April 24, 2016. He was 91.

References

 Alabama Department of Archives and History. Alabama Supreme Court Chief Justices: Perry O. Hooper Sr..   Accessed April 22, 2007.
 Alabama House of Representatives.  2001 Resolution HJR9. February 6, 2001.

1925 births
2016 deaths
Alabama Republicans
Politicians from Montgomery, Alabama
Politicians from Birmingham, Alabama
Military personnel from Alabama
Alabama lawyers
Birmingham–Southern College alumni
University of Alabama School of Law alumni
United States Marines
Chief Justices of the Supreme Court of Alabama
Alabama state court judges
Probate court judges in the United States
Lawyers from Montgomery, Alabama
Military personnel from Montgomery, Alabama
20th-century American judges
21st-century American judges
20th-century American lawyers
20th-century American politicians
United States Marine Corps personnel of World War II